The Suncheon Bay Garden Expo 2013 was the first of its kind to be held in Korea. The Expo focused on green technology development such as solar energy, sustainable garden development and electronic transportation. It showcased green technologies, international garden exhibits, and wetland conservation. It was held in jointly in Suncheon and Suncheon Bay.

Exposition Overview  
 Duration: 2013. Apr. 20 ~ 2013. Oct. 20 (6 months)
 Theme: The Garden of Earth
 Location: Around Suncheon Bay, Korea
 Area: 1,527,000 m2 (152.7 ha)
 Exhibitions - Various eco-parks such as World gardens, arboretum, International wetland center, etc.
 Estimated visitors: 5 million visitors
 personal rapid transit to convey visitors from the Garden Expo site to Suncheon Bay.

Objectives 
 Develop Suncheon Bay, one of the world's top five coastal wetlands and the most well- preserved coastal wetland in the world, into a unique eco garden.
 Develop Suncheon Bay into a representative brand of Korea that is highly recognizable by citizens of the world.
 Build a reservoir to prevent floods and natural disasters.
 Maximize the economic value through developing green industries (forestry, floriculture, and gardening) and ecotourism.

Title 
 The Title - Garden of the Earth - symbolizes the value and characteristic of Suncheon Bay, preserved as one of the best natural gardens of the world.

See also
List of festivals in South Korea
List of festivals in Asia

References

External links
 http://www.2013expo.or.kr/2013/2013_en/

Exhibitions in South Korea
Garden festivals in South Korea
Flower festivals in South Korea
2013 festivals in South Korea